Shen Yang may refer to:

 Shenyang, city in Liaoning, China
 Shen Yang (Eighteen Kingdoms), ruler of Henan of the Eighteen Kingdoms
 Shen Yang (chess player) (born 1989), Chinese female chess player
 Shenyang (singer) (born 1984), Chinese bass-baritone singer
 Xiaoshenyang (born 1981), Chinese errenzhuan actor
 Shen Yang (professor), Chinese professor allegedly involved in the sexual abuse of a female student of Peking University

See also
 Yang Shen